Pweto Territory is a territory in the Haut-Katanga Province of the Democratic Republic of the Congo (DRC).
The headquarters are in the town of Pweto.

Geography

Pweto is part of Haut-Katanga Province.
It lies to the west and north of Lake Mweru on the border with Zambia.
The Luvua River, a headstream of the Congo River, leaves the lake just west of the town of Pwetu to flow north its confluence with the Lualaba River opposite the town of Ankoro.
Other rivers flowing through the territory include the Lubule River, the Lumekele River and the Kilulishi River.
The territory is subdivided into the following chiefdoms and sectors: Kiona-Nzini Chiefdom, Moero Sector, Mwenge Sector and Pweto Chiefdom

Economy

The territory is agriculturally productive and the lake is rich in fish. 
There is no formal industry apart from the Dikulushi Mine near Kilwa, the capital of Moero Sector, operated by Anvil Mining, an Australian company. 
There is informal mining in other areas, including cassiterite pits at the village of Kapulo.
The ore is exported through Zambia, bypassing customs posts.

Security issues

Pweto Territory saw several combats during the Congo wars. With the cease fire, the front line between the RCD-Goma and the Forces Armées Congolaise cut off the north of Pweto from the south.
Although the civil war ended in 2003, the region has been severely damaged by the civil war and reconstruction has been slow.
Most of the rural residents are returned refugees or internally displaced people from other regions.
Basic government services are still not available, public infrastructure is in poor condition and the local economy is scarcely functional. Corruption and lack of confidence in stability are handicaps to investment.

The forests of Pweto territory were once home to thousands of pygmies, locally called Batembo, but only a few hundred families are left. Many of them fled or were killed by the Mai Mai militia of Gédéon Kyungu Mutanga between 2003 and 2006.
Mutanga was later sentenced to death for of crimes against humanity, insurgency, and terrorism.
The pygmies, many of whom have moved to towns and villages for greater security, are marginalized, subject to prejudice and discrimination.

A 2007 report said there was no longer any significant presence of Mayi-Mayi fighters in the territory, but one of the two remaining full FARDC brigades in Katanga was stationed in Pweto Territory. 
This brigade, the 62nd, had a reputation for harassing civilians and had been implicated in illegally exploiting the Cassiterite mine in Kapulo. The soldiers were said to engage in extortion, illegal taxation, forced labour, theft, torture and humiliation of civilians.

Gallery

References

Territories of Haut-Katanga Province